Viale may refer to:

Juan Manuel Viale (born 1981), Argentine footballer
Lucas Viale, Argentine footballer
Julien Viale (born 1982), French footballer